Zahiruddin, born Abdullah Zahiruddin, was a Bangladeshi politician and diplomat. He was the first High Commissioner of Bangladesh to Pakistan.

Career 
Zahiruddin was the Minister of Education and Health of Pakistan before the Independence of Bangladesh.

In 1975, after the assassination of President Sheikh Mujibur Rahman in the 15 August 1975 Bangladeshi coup d'état, Pakistan established ties with Bangladesh. Pakistan was the first country to recoginze the new administration following the coup. In December 1975, Mohammad Khurshid was appointed the first High Commissioner of Pakistan to Bangladesh and Zahiruddin was appointed the first High Commissioner of Bangladesh to Pakistan. He said it was good to be back in Pakistan. He presented his credentials to President Fazal Ilahi Chaudhry on 1 January 1976. While Zulfiqar Ali Bhutto asked how could he called Zahiruddin an ambassador and praised him as a brother in arms. During his term, Tabarak Hossain, the Foreign Secretary of Bangladesh, visited Pakistan on an official visit from 26 to 30 August 1977.

Zahiruddin was the Ambassadors of Bangladesh to Myanmar from 20 June 1978 to 01 August 1980. He succeeded S. A. Karim.

Death 
Zahiruddin died on 2 February 1980. President of Pakistan, General Muhammad Zia-ul-Haq, sent message of condolence to President of Bangladesh, Ziaur Rahman, following Zahiruddin's death.

References 

Bangladeshi diplomats
High Commissioners of Bangladesh to Pakistan
Ambassadors of Bangladesh to Myanmar
1980 deaths

Year of birth missing